Panlongcheng or Panlong City is an archaeological site associated with the Erligang culture during the Shang dynasty period. The site is located just north of the Yangtze river, on the bank of the Panlong lake, and is surrounded by the Fushui river in Huangpi, Wuhan, Hubei, China. Panlongcheng is the largest excavated Erligang site ( at its greatest), showing the southernmost reach of the Erligang culture at its peak. It was discovered in 1954, and excavated in 1974 and 1976.

The central town was  surrounded by a hangtu, or rammed earth, wall. Inside the walls two palaces occupying  were discovered. Panlongcheng may have been an Erligang outpost used to control regional resources, such as copper mines.

The construction and bronze casting techniques at Panlongcheng are identical with the techniques employed at Erligang and Zhengzhou; however, the pottery style is different. The style of Erligang elite burials is almost an exact replica of the burials at Zhengzhou; however, later layers show that the Erligang style disappeared during the later stages of the Erligang culture. The site declined until it was abandoned altogether at the end of the Erligang culture. Panlongcheng's decline may have been affected in part by the growth of the site at Wucheng.

In Hubei Province, other sites such as Jingnansi and Baimiaozhu also feature Erlitou or Late Erlitou–Early Erligang type of ceramics.

Panlongcheng was succeeded by regional and localized cultures such as the Feijiahe culture.

Notes

References
 The Cambridge History of Ancient China : From the Origins of Civilization to 221 BC, Edited by Michael Loewe and Edward L. Shaughnessy.  
 Liu, Li and Xingcan Chen, State Formation in Early China, 
 

Archaeological sites in China
Wuhan
National archaeological parks of China
Chinese architectural history
Former populated places in China
Major National Historical and Cultural Sites in Hubei
Shang dynasty
16th-century BC establishments in China